Vasily Nikolayevich Azhayev (born  – April 27, 1968) was a Soviet and Russian writer, best known as the author of the novel Daleko ot Moskvy (""; Far from Moscow) (1948, Stalin Prize of 1949), which served as the basis for several eponymous film, stage and TV adaptations, and an opera.

External links

 Biography
 Short Biography

1915 births
1968 deaths
People from Taldomsky District
People from Moscow Governorate
Russian male novelists
Russian male writers
20th-century Russian male writers
Socialist realism writers
Soviet male writers
Soviet novelists
Maxim Gorky Literature Institute alumni
Gulag detainees
Stalin Prize winners
Recipients of the Order of the Red Banner of Labour
Burials at Novodevichy Cemetery